Faizan Peerzada (born 1958 Lahore – died December 21, 2012, Lahore) was a Pakistani artist, puppeteer and theater director.

Career 
Peerzada started his artistic journey long before his career. He began painting and crafting puppets as a young adult and his lifelong passion for the arts colored the course of his entire life. His mark in the artistic world remains as a puppeteer, a painter and a patron of the arts. Peerzada also received the 'Thamgha-e-Imtiaz', the Presidential Award for Puppetry in 2004.

Life of Faizan Peerzada
1958
Producer, director, and puppeteer was born with a twin brother in Lahore
He held his first painting exhibition at the American Cultural Centre, Karachi
1977
Faizan held approximately 40 painting exhibitions in Pakistan, and 26 solo art exhibitions in the United States and Europe
Faizan began his career at Rafi Peer Theatre Workshop, and later became the artistic director
1979
He specially designed programmes to celebrate the International Year of the Child spread over the entire year
Designed three major art festivals in which at least 35,000 children participated in a span of six months.
1980
Faizan's fascination for lights began (He designed stages and lights for several Pakistani and International events)
1992
Faizan was the integral driving force in creating 15 International Festivals of Puppets, Theatre, Music, and Dance
1998
Faizan's Fourth International Puppet Festival held in Lahore was declared internationally as the biggest international puppet festival in the world
1993
He was made the president of UNIMA (world-wide puppetry organisation) in Pakistan.

Death 
Faizan Peerzada died of a heart attack at the age of fifty four on December 21, 2012, in Lahore.

References 

2012 deaths
Pakistani artists
Pakistani graphic designers
Pakistani puppeteers
Pakistani theatre directors
1958 births
Artists from Lahore